Kolas may refer to:

Yakub Kolas (1882–1956), Belarusian writer
Kolas Yotaka (born 1974), Taiwanese politician and journalist